Kitcisakik or Grand-Lac Victoria Indian Settlement is an Indian settlement of the Kitcisakik Anicinape Community located in the Abitibi-Témiscamingue region of Quebec, Canada. It is geographically located within the territory of La Vallée-de-l'Or Regional County Municipality. Its population was 257 in the 2021 Canadian Census. Prior to October 23, 1999, it was known as Grand-Lac-Victoria.

On June 21, 2021, it was designated as a historic site by the Government of Quebec.

References

External links
 Communauté anicinape de Kitcisakik (Indigenous and Northern Affairs Canada)

Indian settlements in Quebec
Communities in Abitibi-Témiscamingue
Heritage sites in Quebec